The 1964 Eisenhower Trophy took place 7–10 October at the Olgiata Golf Club in Olgiata, north of Rome, Italy. It was the fourth World Amateur Team Championship for the Eisenhower Trophy. The tournament was a 72-hole stroke play team event with 33 four-man teams. The best three scores for each round counted towards the team total.

Great Britain and Ireland won the Eisenhower Trophy, beating Canada by two strokes. Canada took the silver medal while New Zealand, a further three strokes behind, took the bronze. The defending champions, the United States, finished fourth.

Teams
33 teams contested the event. Each team had four players.

The following table lists the players on the leading teams.

Scores

Source:

Individual leaders
There was no official recognition for the lowest individual scores.

Source:

References

External links
Record Book on International Golf Federation website

Eisenhower Trophy
Golf tournaments in Italy
Eisenhower Trophy
Eisenhower Trophy
Eisenhower Trophy